Adenodolichos huillensis is a plant in the legume family Fabaceae, native to Angola and Zambia.

Description
Inflorescences are axillary or terminal and feature white, purple, blue or pink flowers.

References

huillensis
Flora of Angola
Flora of Zambia
Plants described in 1965